Robinsonia rockstonia is a moth in the family Erebidae. It was described by William Schaus in 1905. It is found in French Guiana, Guyana and Amazonas.

References

Moths described in 1905
Robinsonia (moth)
Arctiinae of South America